Michael Robert Baldassin (born July 26, 1955) is a former professional American football player who played linebacker for two NFL seasons for the San Francisco 49ers.

High school 
Baldassin was born in Tacoma, Washington and played at Woodrow Wilson High School where he was an All-State third baseman and also earned team MVP and All-City football honors.  He originally signed to play football at the University of Puget Sound, but his performance in the East-West All-Star drew interest from several Pac-8 schools, including Washington.

College career 
Baldassin enrolled at the University of Washington in 1973, where he earned three varsity letters from 1974 to 1976. He led the team in tackles in both 1975 and 1976, leading the nation as well in 1976, achieving several season and career records for tackles. He was a captain of the 1976 team. and was awarded both the team's "Most Inspirational"  and "Most Improved" awards.

Professional career 
Baldassin was not drafted, but played two seasons for the San Francisco 49ers.

Later life 
Baldassin became a police officer in both Oakland and Seattle, earning the Medal of Valor in Oakland.  He later became a teacher and coach at Bellarmine Preparatory School, serving as head football coach from 1996-2002. He won three league championships and made four state playoff appearances, and was recognized with multiple Coach of the Year honors.

See also 
 Washington Huskies football statistical leaders

References

External links 
 

1955 births
Living people
Players of American football from Tacoma, Washington
American football linebackers
Washington Huskies football players
San Francisco 49ers players
University of Washington alumni